The 1999–2000 Dayton Flyers men's basketball team represented the University of Dayton during the 1999–2000 NCAA Division I men's basketball season. The Flyers, led by ninth year head coach Oliver Purnell, played their home games at the University of Dayton Arena and were members of the Atlantic 10 Conference. They finished the season 22–9, 11–5 in A-10 play. They fell in the semifinal round of the Atlantic 10 tournament, but received an at-large bid to the NCAA tournament. As No. 11 seed in the West region, the Flyers were beaten by No. 6 seed and eventual regional runner-up Purdue.

Roster

Schedule and results

|-
!colspan=9 style=| Non-conference regular season

|-
!colspan=9 style=| Atlantic 10 regular season

|-
!colspan=9 style=| Atlantic 10 tournament

|-
!colspan=9 style=| NCAA tournament

References

Dayton Flyers men's basketball seasons
Dayton
Dayton
Dayton
Dayton